The brown-headed greenlet (Hylophilus brunneiceps) is a species of bird in the family Vireonidae.
It is found in northwestern Amazon Basin of Brazil, Colombia and Venezuela.
Its natural habitat is subtropical or tropical dry shrubland.

References

brown-headed greenlet
Birds of the Amazon Basin
Birds of the Colombian Amazon
Birds of the Venezuelan Amazon
brown-headed greenlet
brown-headed greenlet
Taxonomy articles created by Polbot